Norah Elisabeth Milanesi (born 23 January 2003 in Broni, Italy) is a Cameroonian swimmer. She competed in the women's 50 metre freestyle at the 2020 Summer Olympics.

Personal life
Milanesi was born in Italy, and is of Cameroonian and Italian descent.

References

External links
 

2003 births
Living people
People from Broni
Cameroonian female freestyle swimmers
Olympic swimmers of Cameroon
Swimmers at the 2020 Summer Olympics
Italian sportspeople of African descent
Cameroonian people of Italian descent
Italian people of Cameroonian descent
Italian female freestyle swimmers
Sportspeople from the Province of Pavia
Swimmers at the 2022 Commonwealth Games
Commonwealth Games competitors for Cameroon